Kenyarctia is a genus of tiger moths in the family Erebidae.

Species
 Kenyarctia epicaste (Fawcett, 1915)
 Kenyarctia melanogastra (Holland, 1897)
 Kenyarctia occidentalis (Bartel, 1903)

References

Natural History Museum Lepidoptera generic names catalog

Spilosomina
Moth genera